Stanley March (born 26 December 1938) is an English former footballer.

Career
March played for Altrincham before joining Port Vale for £250 in August 1959. He appeared as a substitute in the first leg of the Supporters' Clubs' Trophy final on 5 October 1959, Vale lost 3–1. He made his full debut in the league on 19 March 1960, a goalless home draw with Queen's Park Rangers. He was not selected again and was released at the end of the 1961–62 season, moving on to Macclesfield, Mossley and Stafford Rangers.

Career statistics
Source:

References

1938 births
Living people
Footballers from Manchester
English footballers
Association football inside forwards
Altrincham F.C. players
Port Vale F.C. players
Macclesfield Town F.C. players
Mossley A.F.C. players
Stafford Rangers F.C. players
English Football League players